Heathen is an American thrash metal band from San Francisco, California. Formed in 1984, the group originally consisted of lead vocalist Sam Kress, guitarists Lee Altus and Jim Sanguinetti, and drummer Carl Sacco. After the band's first live performance, Kress and Sanguinetti were replaced by David White (then known as David Godfrey) and Doug Piercy, respectively, while Eric Wong was brought in as their first bassist. The group's current lineup features Altus, the sole constant member, alongside White (who rejoined in 1989 after leaving in 1988), guitarist Kragen Lum (since 2007), bassist Jason Mirza (since 2019) and drummer Jim DeMaria (since 2020).

History

1984–1993
Heathen was formed in 1984 by Lee Altus and Carl Sacco, who brought in Sam Kress and Jim Sanguinetti to complete the original lineup. After the band's first show, Kress and Sanguinetti were replaced by David White (then David Godfrey) and Doug Piercy, respectively, while Eric Wong was added as the group's first bassist. After the release of the band's first demo Pray for Death in 1986, Wong was replaced by Mike "Yaz" Jastremski. With the new bassist, Heathen released its full-length debut album Breaking the Silence on Combat Records in 1987. After the album's promotional touring cycle, Sacco left Heathen and was replaced by Darren Minter. During late 1988, Godfrey was replaced by former Exodus frontman Paul Baloff, who recorded a demo with the band.

After the recording of the demo with Baloff, Jastremski was replaced by Manny Bravo. Baloff left at the beginning of 1989. He was replaced briefly by David Wayne (formerly of Metal Church), followed by Rick Weaver, before Godfrey (now using the name David White) returned in time for the recording of demo Opiate of the Masses in March. The demo also featured new bassist Vern McElroy of Blind Illusion; in 1990, the band recorded Victims of Deception with session stand-in Marc Biedermann, before Randy Laire took over. During his first tour, Laire died in a car accident in September 1991. He was replaced by Jason VieBrooks.

In 1992, Piercy was replaced by Ira Black. The group began work on a planned third album, but broke up the following year. Altus and Minter later joined industrial metal band Die Krupps, White joined Defiance, and VieBrooks co-founded groove metal supergroup Grip Inc.

2001–2019
Heathen reformed in August 2001, with returning members White, Altus, Black and Minter joined by former bassist Mike Jastremski. In June 2004, after the release of Recovered, Jastremski was replaced by Jon Torres. Not long after, Black also left the band, with former Mercenary guitarist Sven Soderlund temporarily taking his place. The remaining four members recorded a demo in early 2005, before announcing the addition of Terry Lauderdale on guitar that June.

Shortly after starting work on a planned third album, Heathen announced in December 2007 that Lauderdale and Minter had left the group, replaced by Prototype guitarist Kragen Lum and former Vio-lence drummer Mark Hernandez, respectively. Less than a year later, Minter had returned to the lineup. The long-awaited third album, The Evolution of Chaos, was recorded with the new lineup and first released in December 2009. During the subsequent touring cycle, Jason VieBrooks returned starting in January 2011 to replace Torres, who temporarily left to "focus on his health". Torres later died on September 2, 2013, and VieBrooks remained a member of the band.

In the spring of 2011, Minter was temporarily replaced by Jon Dette in the spring due to "previous work commitments" which prevented him from touring. Two years later, Minter left permanently and Dette stepped in again for tour dates in the summer of 2013. After more than a year of inactivity, in January 2015 the band played with former Forbidden drummer Sasha Horn.

Since 2019
After another extended period of inactivity, Heathen announced in June 2019 that it had begun work on a new album. When the result, Empire of the Blind, was announced the following year, it was also revealed that the lineup featured new bassist Jason Mirza and drummer Jim DeMaria.

Members

Current

Former

Backup

Timeline

Lineups

References

External links
Heathen official website

Heathen